NeuroNation is a German cognitive training website and app that was launched in 2011.  The app is available on Android and iOS and as of 2015, was offered in eight languages.   

Its use is reimbursed by several German health insurers, including Deutsche BKK.    While the NeuroNation app and similar ones are heavily advertised with claims of improving general cognitive function, there is no evidence to show that NeuroNation or similar programs do so; at most they improve performance in the training tasks given in the program.

The online platform was launched in 2011, and initially served Germany, Austria, and Switzerland. In 2014, Der Spiegel and XLHealth AG bought a 25% stake in NeuroNation, financing an expansion into French, Spanish, Russian, and Portuguese markets.

The program began with a single-payment model, later shifting to a subscription business model. The app offers some content free, while other activities are available through in-app purchases.

References

External links
NeuroNation homepage

Brain training programs